Ayşe Sultan ("the living one" or "womanly", died  1640) was a consort of Sultan Osman II of the Ottoman Empire.

Life

Her name appears in privy purse registers from 1619 on, but nothing is known about her except her name.

According to Peirce, Ayşe was Osman's haseki sultan. But according to Piterberg, Osman II did not have a haseki and Ayşe was just "a politically insignificant consort." Even though her status was debatable, it is clear that Ayşe could not become a prominent female figure like other haseki sultans.  Also, a governess (daye hatun, lit. wet-nurse) who was appointed as a stand-in valide, could not counterbalance the contriving of Mustafa I's mother in the Old Palace. This condition made the conspious absence of a female power basis in the harem during her spouse's reign, the basic and exceptional weakness from which Osman II suffered.

After Osman's death in 1622 she stayed in the Old Palace. Privy Purse records her presence lastly in 1640.

References

Sources 
 
 

17th-century consorts of Ottoman sultans
Year of death missing